Saad Dahane (born 18 February 1956) is a Moroccan footballer. He competed in the men's tournament at the 1984 Summer Olympics.

References

External links
 

1956 births
Living people
Moroccan footballers
Morocco international footballers
Olympic footballers of Morocco
Footballers at the 1984 Summer Olympics
Place of birth missing (living people)
Association football defenders